The 1986–87 Hellenic Football League season was the 34th in the history of the Hellenic Football League, a football competition in England.

Premier Division

The Premier Division featured 16 clubs which competed in the division last season, along with two new clubs, promoted from Division One:
Penhill
Viking Sports

League table

Division One

Division One featured twelve clubs which competed in the division last season, along with six new clubs:
Almondsbury Greenway, relegated from the Premier Division
Carterton Town, joined from the Witney and District League
Cheltenham Saracens, joined from the Cheltenham League
Cheltenham Town reserves, transferred from the Midland Combination Division One
Chipping Norton Town, joined from the Oxfordshire Senior League
Purton, joined from the Wiltshire League

League table

References

External links
 Hellenic Football League

1986-87
8